Kyle Manscuk (born March 5, 1989 in Rochester, New York) is an American soccer player.

External links
 Bearcats profile

1989 births
Living people
American soccer players
FC London players
Ottawa Fury (2005–2013) players
Rochester New York FC players
USL League Two players
USL Championship players
Soccer players from New York (state)
Association football defenders
Binghamton Bearcats men's soccer players